Lighthouse Trails Publishing is a Christian publishing company located in Eureka, Montana.
The company publishes biographies, documentaries, research articles, apologetics documents, children's novels, and various other related topics. Lighthouse Trails Publishing has 35 authors and editors with around 20,000 people.

History
Lighthouse Trails was founded in 2002 by David and Deborah Dombrowski from Silverton, Oregon. They decided to start the company as an apologetics outreach in hopes of exposing what they saw as the dangers of the Emerging church and the Contemplative prayer movement. Their research project, named Lighthouse Trails Research, in turn received criticism from Moody Bible Institute regarding certain areas of belief in the emerging church movement.
In spring of 2010 the company saw some major changes, including moving its headquarters to Eureka, Montana, the creation of the Shepherd's Organic Bible Verse Tea brand of products, and partnering with author Roger Oakland and his ministry Understand the Times to create the Missions for Truth project, which helps widows and children by working with a group of pastors in western Kenya.

The company advertised in the 2011 and 2014 editions of Christian Writers' Market Guide.

See also
List of English language book publishers
Bibliography of The Holocaust

References

External links
Lighthouse Trail Publishing
Lighthouse Trails Research

Book publishing companies based in Montana
Christian publishing companies
Christianity in Montana
Publishing companies established in 2002
Emerging church movement
Apologetics
2002 establishments in Oregon